"Phenomena" is a song written by Brian Chase, Karen Lee Orzolek, Nick Zinner and recorded by the Yeah Yeah Yeahs from their Show Your Bones album, released on Interscope/Polydor in 2006.

Details
The song's refrain, "Something like a phenomenon", echoes previous uses in recordings such as Liquid Liquid's "Cavern".

The song was featured in the 2008 horror film, The Ruins, and a 2013 Cadillac television advertisement.
It was also featured on the first episode of the miniseries "Flesh and Bone" (2015).

References

External links

Yeah Yeah Yeahs songs
2006 songs
Songs written by Karen O
Songs written by Brian Chase
Songs written by Nick Zinner